"Big Plans" is a song performed by American boy band Why Don't We. The song was released as a digital download on January 16, 2019 by Signature and Atlantic Records. The song was written by Corbyn Besson, Daniel Seavey, Earwulf, Jacob Torrey, James LaVigne and Jonah Marais.

Music video
A music video to accompany the release of "Big Plans" was first released onto YouTube on January 20, 2019. The video was directed by Henry Lipatov.

Track listing

Personnel
Credits adapted from Tidal. 
 Earwulf – Producer, writer
 Chris Gehringer – Mastering Engineer
 Anders Hvenare – Mixing Engineer
 Andi Inadomi – Production
 Corbyn Besson – Vocals, writer
 Daniel Seavey – Vocals, writer
 Jack Avery – Vocals
 Jonah Marais – Vocals, writer
 Zach Herron – Vocals
 Jacob Torrey – Writer
 James LaVigne – Writer

Charts

Certifications

Release history

References

2019 songs
Why Don't We songs